Francis Pierrepont (10 March 1662ca. 1693) was an English politician.

He was the eldest son of Robert Pierrepont, MP and Anne Murray.

He was a Justice of the Peace (JP) for  Nottinghamshire from 1689 to his death and a deputy-lieutenant for the county from 1689 to his death. He was also elected Member of Parliament (MP) for Nottingham from  1689 to 1690.

He died unmarried around the age of 31.

References

1662 births
1690s deaths
English MPs 1689–1690